Seduction: The Cruel Woman (Verführung: Die grausame Frau) is a 1985 West German film, directed by  and Monika Treut, who both also wrote the screenplay. The film was inspired by Leopold von Sacher-Masoch's Venus in Furs.

Synopsis
Wanda is a dominatrix who runs a gallery in Hamburg. She lures men and women of all types into her sadomasochistic world where audiences pay for the privilege of seeing her humiliate her slaves. The end is an ultimate mix of eros and thanatos.

Cast
 as Wanda
Udo Kier as Gregor
Sheila McLaughlin as Justine
 as Caren
Peter Weibel as Herr Maehrsch, Journalist
 as Friederike
Barbara Ossenkopp: Leila
Daniela Ziegler: Mother

Film Festivals
The movie was shown at the following film festivals, among others:
1985 Berlin International Film Festival, Forum
1985 San Francisco International Lesbian and Gay Film Festival

See also 
Sadism and masochism in fiction

References

External links
 Official website
 

1985 films
1985 drama films
1985 LGBT-related films
German drama films
German LGBT-related films
West German films
1980s German-language films
BDSM in films
Lesbian-related films
LGBT-related drama films
First Run Features films
1980s German films